Bryan Odell (born May 22, 1990), better known by his online alias BryanStars, is an American former music interviewer, YouTube personality, musician, and artist manager. He is best known for his BryanStars Interviews series, where he interviews with popular artists in the alternative scene, including Black Veil Brides, Asking Alexandria, and Falling in Reverse.

Early life
Odell was born on May 22, 1990, in Japan, where he resided until he was eight years old. His family later relocated to Dallas, Texas, and then again to Nebraska when he was a teenager. He attended Lincoln East High School, where he graduated in 2008. In his senior year, his short film Energy Crisis in America, highlighting rising gas prices, won third place in the high school section of the StudentCam competition, hosted by C-SPAN.

He attended the University of Nebraska–Lincoln for two years, majoring in Broadcast Journalism. While in university, he did an internship where he would interview professional bands for a local television station.

Odell chose to drop out of university to focus his attention on his YouTube channel "BryanStars" after winning YouTube NextUp in 2011. Through the NextUp contest, YouTube aimed to foster creators on its platform. Odell and 25 other YouTubers received a $35,000 grant for their channel and a multi-day workshop in New York City with professional online bloggers. At the time, he had about 55,000 subscribers.

YouTube career 
Odell is best known for his BryanStars Interviews, series on his YouTube channel, BryanStars. He primarily publishes interviews and music videos from bands of the rock and heavy metal scene.

During his career, Odell interviewed artists including Asking Alexandria, Blood On The Dance Floor, Never Shout Never, Motionless In White, Pierce the Veil, Black Veil Brides, All Time Low, Sleeping with Sirens, The Ready Set, One Ok Rock, Panic! at the Disco, Twenty One Pilots, Avenged Sevenfold, Escape the Fate, Suicide Silence, Disturbed, Creed, Hollywood Undead, Korn, Three Days Grace, Bullet For My Valentine, Cannibal Corpse, Chevelle, and Slipknot, as well as artists like Rob Zombie, Papa Roach, Cody Simpson, G-Eazy, Mitchel Musso and winners of American Idol. Odell has also interviewed record producer Matt Good and YouTube stars Shane Dawson, Michael Buckley and Dave Days. He has published more than 1000 band interviews and music videos to his YouTube Channel.

In 2013, BryanStars Interviews was voted by music fans as the "Best Music Blog" in the Alternative Press Reader's Choice Poll 2013. BryanStars Interviews was nominated for a Shorty Award for “Best Web Show” in 2014 along with Jerry Seinfeld's Comedians in Cars Getting Coffee. In 2014, retailer Journeys produced "This Is My Journey" segment about Odell that played in stores nationwide.

Never Shout Never incident 
On June 3, 2012, Never Shout Never was interviewed by Odell in an interview that was being covered by The New York Times. Never Shout Never lead vocalist Christofer Drew Ingle was aware of The New York Times coverage of the interview. About halfway through the interview, Ingle cut Odell off, denouncing his show as "a joke" and his questions as "bullshit" with bassist Taylor MacFee also taking Odell's interview question papers from him, throwing them on the floor, and finding his questions to be annoying and irrelevant. As a result, the band abruptly ended the interview, leaving Odell in tears.

An outpour of support for Odell resulted from the incident. Numerous musicians such as Kellin Quinn of Sleeping with Sirens, Chris Fronzak of Attila, and Andy Biersack of Black Veil Brides came to Odell's defense. In a Stickam broadcast, Ingle expressed remorse for making Odell cry, later admitting that he had taken acid earlier the day of the interview.

Warped YouTube Program 
In 2014, Odell was picked to be one of the “Warped YouTubers” with Damon Fizzy (also calling himself DeeFizzy), Johnnie Guilbert, CYR and Piddleass. The following year, Kevin Lyman (creator of Warped Tour) made Odell the official host of the tour. Odell worked with Warped Tour through 2015 as their official host on all social media, announcing over 100 bands for the tour.

Odell taught a class on the 2015 Vans Warped Tour called "YouTube 101" where he taught aspiring YouTubers how to pursue a career in social media.

My Digital Escape 
Odell then founded "My Digital Escape," a collaborative project and YouTube channel featuring numerous smaller creators who shared a similar passion for music. While an active creator in My Digital Escape (MDE), Odell served as manager of the project as well. The channel stopped uploading in May 2016. The channel reached 800,000 subscribers and 100 million views. The channel prominently featured Odell, Johnnie Guilbert, Shannon Taylor (HeyThereImShannon), Luke Wale, Kyle David Hall, Alex Dorame and Jordan Sweeto. In 2016, My Digital Escape went on tour across the United States and visited 21 cities.

Musical endeavors 
In 2016, Odell went into the studio with ZK Studios to record his debut EP. On March 21, 2016, BryanStars announced the release of a 5-track EP entitled "Follow Your Dreams". It was released on April 1, 2016, and charted on Billboard at #22 on the Alternative New Artist Album Chart, #59 on the New Artist Album Chart and #128 on the Indie Albums Chart.

BryanStars also collaborated with Social Repose on a cover of Bring Me The Horizon's "Follow You".

In November 2016, Odell announced that he would be releasing a second EP titled the "Picture Perfect EP". It was released on December 4, 2016.

BryanStars Tour 
In 2012, Odell started the "BryanStars Tour", which toured throughout the United States. Odell created three BryanStars Tours from 2012 to 2013.

Personal life 
Odell revealed his homosexuality on his YouTube channel in 2017. After considerable controversy later that same year due to being accused of covering up for convicted sex offender Austin Jones, Odell stepped back from his social media ventures, specifically his YouTube channels. He has not been active on any of his YouTube channels or social media since.

Awards and recognition 
 2011: YouTube NextUp
 2013: Alternative Press Magazine — "Best Music Blog"
 2014: Shorty Award for “Best Web Show” — Nominated

Discography

Extended plays

Singles

References

External links 
 

1990 births
Living people
American expatriates in Japan
American gay musicians
LGBT YouTubers
YouTubers from Texas
Musicians from Lincoln, Nebraska
University of Nebraska–Lincoln alumni
Writers from Lincoln, Nebraska
20th-century American LGBT people
21st-century LGBT people
LGBT people from Nebraska